Olive Smith may refer to:

 Olive Smith, (1906–1993), Irish conductor
 Olive Smith (masseuse), (1880–1916), masseuse, Scottish Women's Hospitals for Foreign Service
 Olive Smith (cricketer),(1993–2014), Australian cricketer

See also 

 Olive Smith-Dorrien, (1881–1951) creator of hospital bag fund World War I